Keralapuram is a suburban town in Kollam District of Kerala, India. It is located on National Highway 744 (India) at a distance of around 10 kilometers from Kollam City in the direction of Kottarakkara.

History
Keralapuram lies in between the historic trade hub Kundara, and Kollam, a major port city of the Travancore Kingdom. The Kundara Proclamation by Velu Thampi Dalawa in the year 1809, which is considered to be one of the first event of freedom fight against the British Raj in Kerala, happened at a distance of 3 kilometers from the present day Keralapuram. First industries in Keralapuram are from the cashew industry boom of Kollam.

Keralapuram has a Government High School established in the year 1946 and a Public Library established in the year 1948. Another piece of history is the famous restaurant Ezhuthanikada Hotel, started by Meeran Saheb in 1948, which is now a local landmark. The vettu cake of this restaurant is very popular across the state of Kerala and among the Malayali diaspora in Middle East.

Location
Keralapuram is located on Kollam Tirumangalam National Highway at a distance of 10.5 km away from Kollam city and 3 km away from Kundara. A sizeable portion of the town falls on Kottamkara Panchayath on the East side of the highway, and remaining portion on Perinad Panchayath on the west side. It is also the junction where Ayoor Road, Mampuzha Road and Edavattom Road meets NH 744.

Thangal Kunju Musaliar College of Engineering (TKMCE), one of the premiere engineering institutes in Kerala, is located 4.3 kilometres from here.

Transportation

Keralapuram is connected with various important towns in Kollam district.
Kottiyam
Kottarakkara
Kundara
 Nearest Airport - Trivandrum International Airport Approx: 65 km. 1 hour 30 mins.

Education

Keralapuram Government High School
Peniel Public School
St. Vincent's ICSE School

Hospitals

ESIC Hospital
Devans Hospital
SSR Hospital

Banks / Financial Institutions

State Bank of India, Keralapuram Branch 
Indian Bank, Keralapuram Branch 
KSFE Keralapuram
Kottamkara Service Sahakarana Bank

Places of Worship
Keralapuram has numerous places of worship, some of them are listed.
 Varattuchira Temple
 Keralapuram Juma Masjid
 Poojappura Temple
 Puthankulangara Temple
 St. Vincent's Convent and Church

Major Industries
Keralapuram had several major cashew factories, some of which are sill in operation.

Prominent Persons
Some of the prominent persons hailing from the area include 
 J. Mercykutty Amma, Former Minister for Fisheries, Harbour Engineering & Cashew Industries
 Kainakary Thankaraj, Prominent movie actor, play director and play actor.
 S Kalam, Prominent play director and actor. Two of his dramas became movies.

See also
 Keralapura, Karnataka state.
 Keralapuram in Diglipur Tehsil of Andaman and Nicobar Islands

References

 Large Industrial Establishments in India By India. Labour Bureau

Villages in Kollam district